Palmerah Station (PLM) is a railway station located in Jalan Tentara Pelajar, Gelora, Tanah Abang, Central Jakarta, near the Palmerah market. The station is located in the altitude of +13 meters above sea level, and only serves KRL Commuterline.

Palmerah Station was rebuilt in 2013–2014 and features a new two-storey station building. The old building was preserved and the new building straddles above it.

The Palmerah market and Parliament building is located adjacent to the station. The station services the Gelora Bung Karno Stadium and the surrounding sports complex.

History

Background 
During the Dutch East Indies era, the Palmerah area was one of the sub-districts in the Special Capital Region of Jakarta, which was strategically located. The origin of the name Palmerah comes from the red stakes that are located on the side of the road in that area, and the local people then call it Paal Merah. These stakes functioned as markers for the boundaries of the Batavia area towards Buitenzorg. In the past, the Governor General of the Dutch East Indies who was in power at that time often passed this road when he wanted to ride a horse-drawn carriage from Batavia to the Bogor Palace.

To make the mobility of passengers from Batavia to Rangkasbitung to the Banten area smoother, in the 1890s the Staatsspoorwegen company built a railroad line and its stations (including Palmerah Station) that connected the Duri area to the Rangkasbitung area, passing through the Tanah Abang area. This project was completed in 1899, and regular trains serving the route were immediately started.

Developments

1960s-1970s 
In the early 1960s, the Gelora Bung Karno Main Stadium (GBK) was built in order to host the 1962 Asian Games, and this development package is also expected to include 2 overpasses, namely the Jalan Arteria Raya overpass located in the Rawa Simprug area, and also the Inner City Toll Road overpass which is located in the Pejompongan area. To help facilitate the sending and loading and unloading of construction materials, a branch rail was made from Palmerah Station to the Gelora Bung Karno construction site. Building materials such as sand, stone, lime, and the like are brought by rail transport, these materials were taken from the branch rail near Rawa Buntu Station which leads to the banks of the Cisadane river. The same thing happened at Kebayoran Station, in the era of the 1950-60s this station had a branch rail towards the warehouse managed by the Ministry of Public Works (PU) to unload materials transported via the rail line for the Kebayoran Baru satellite city development needs. The carriages transporting the materials for the GBK construction were parked at the Palmerah Station embankment, which at that time still had a lot of stockpile for project needs, and the carriages were shunting to the construction site using the B51 steam locomotive. Also, at that time, a branch rail was built that led to Pejompongan for the purposes of building a drinking water company (PAM). Materials for the construction of this PAM were brought by rail transport and unloaded at the construction site. The branch rail leading to the Gelora Bung Karno project was only used during the construction period and was not used again when the construction period was over, until finally it was dismantled at some point and the former railbed has become Gelora street. The same thing also happened to the branch rail leading to the Drinking Water Company project, the branch rail was only used during the construction period and was not used again when the construction period was over, until finally this branch rail was closed at some point and the former railbed was removed and becomes a dense settlement next to Jalan Pejompongan Raya. This one branch rail was not completely dismantled, but some were just covered with earth or asphalt. There are still pieces of rail left in a dense residential alley where the railbed used to be. The remaining pieces of rail were deliberately not dismantled and used by residents as a small bridge to cross a ditch or gutter.

In the 1960-70s, Palmerah Station had a wide emplacement and quite a number of tracks. It is estimated that there are 5 railroad tracks to the left of the emplacement and 2 railroad tracks or dead ends to the right of the emplacement (from the direction of Tanah Abang Station), as well as 2 lanes for passing and crossing. The 5 railroad tracks on the left side of the emplacement are used for storing or stabling goods carriages, which were also used to store a series of carriages for the construction of the Bung Karno Main Stadium. Meanwhile, the 2 badug rails or dead-end lanes on the right side of the emplacement are used for loading and unloading sand, stone, lime, wood charcoal, and the like. At that time, the B51 steam locomotive, the C300 locomotive, and the BB300 locomotive were used for yard activities at this station emplacement.

1990s 
It is estimated that in the early 1990s the siding rails at Palmerah Station were dismantled because they were no longer needed, leaving only 2 lanes for traffic or crossings. The former railroad tracks were later built into Tentara Pelajar Street on both sides of the station, both those that lead to Pejompongan and those that lead the other way, namely towards Rawa Simprug.

In 1992-1994, the Tanah Abang-Serpong line was then electrified with French model Overhead power line (LAA), one of which was to support the Serpong Ekspres KRL trip which was touted as the forerunner of the KRL Green Line. Also, it is estimated that in the early 1990s the Palmerah Station platform was also renovated into a higher platform.

2000s 
In the early 2000s, Palmerah Station had 2 tracks, with line 1 (as a straight train) and line 2 (as a turning train). Since the operation of the double track on the Tanah Abang-Serpong line as of 4 July 2007, the layout of this station has been overhauled by adding line 2 as a new straight line.

2013-present 
In 2013-2015, the Indonesian Ministry of Transportation carried out a major renovation of this station into two levels, so that the Palmerah Station complex became even wider and more magnificent. This project costs around IDR 36 billion, and was inaugurated on July 6, 2015. Even though Palmerah Station has been renovated to become very grand and spacious, the old station building which is a legacy of the Staatsspoorwegen is still maintained today.

Further arrangements was also made in 2020-2021, with the aim of strengthening intermodal integration (especially TransJakarta) and facilitating access for pedestrians. This arrangement was inaugurated on 29 September 2021, along with a similar project in Tebet. This arrangement was carried out under PT Moda Integrasi Transportasi Jakarta (MITJ), a joint venture between the Jakarta MRT, and Kereta Api Indonesia.

In November 2020, the Jakarta provincial Transportation Service closed the level crossing at Palmerah Station permanently. One of the goals is to eliminate traffic violations that often occur at these crossings. This was revealed by the head of the DKI Jakarta provincial transportation agency, Syafrin Liputo. He said closing the level crossing was part of the stage 2 of the arrangement of the Palmerah Station area.

Building and layout 
In the 1960-70s, Palmerah Station was estimated to have 9 lines and 2 branch rails. There are 5 railroad tracks to the left of the emplacement and 2 buffer stops to the right of the emplacement (from Tanah Abang Station). The 5 storage rails on the left side of the emplacement were used to store or stabling goods carriages, which were also used to store a series of carriages for the construction of the Gelora Bung Karno Main Stadium. Meanwhile, the 2 buffer stops or dead-end lanes on the right side of the emplacement are used for loading and unloading sand, stone, lime, wood charcoal, and the like. There are also 2 branch rails that go in 2 different directions, namely towards the Gelora Bung Karno Main Stadium for loading and unloading construction materials, and towards Pejompongan for loading and unloading materials for the construction of the Drinking Water Company (PAM).

It is estimated that in the early 1990s the siding rails at Palmerah Station were dismantled because they were no longer needed, leaving only 2 lanes for traffic or crossings. The former railroad tracks were later built into Tentara Pelajar Street on both sides of the station, both those that lead to Pejompongan and those that lead the other way, namely towards Rawa Simprug.

In the early 2000s, Palmerah Station had 2 tracks, with line 1 (as a straight train) and line 2 (as a turning train). Since the operation of the double track on the Tanah Abang-Serpong line as of 4 July 2007, the layout of this station has been overhauled by adding line 2 as a new straight line.

In 2013-2015, the Indonesian Ministry of Transportation carried out a major renovation of this station into two levels, so that the Palmerah Station complex became even wider and more magnificent. This project costs around IDR 36 billion, and was inaugurated on July 6, 2015. Even though Palmerah Station has been renovated to become very grand and spacious, the old station building which is a legacy of the Staatsspoorwegen is still maintained today.

Further arrangements was also made in 2020-2021, with the aim of strengthening intermodal integration (especially TransJakarta) and facilitating access for pedestrians. This arrangement was inaugurated on 29 September 2021, along with a similar project in Tebet. This arrangement was carried out under PT Moda Integrasi Transportasi Jakarta (MITJ), a joint venture between the Jakarta MRT, and Kereta Api Indonesia.

Services
The following is a list of train services at the Palmerah Station.
KRL Commuterline

Supporting Transportation

Gallery

References

External links

Railway stations in Jakarta
Railway stations opened in 1881
1881 establishments in the Dutch Empire